The Texas A&M–Corpus Christi Islanders baseball team is a varsity intercollegiate athletic team of Texas A&M University–Corpus Christi in Corpus Christi, Texas, United States. The team is a member of the Southland Conference, which is part of the National Collegiate Athletic Association's Division I. The team plays its home games at on-campus Chapman Field in Corpus Christi, Texas. Off-campus Whataburger Field is the home venue for some high-profile games and tournaments.  The Islanders are coached by Scott Malone.

History

Conference membership history
 2000–2006: Division III Independent
 2007–Present: Southland Conference

Head coaches

Year-by-year results

Major League Baseball
Texas A&M–Corpus Christi has had 14 Major League Baseball Draft selections since the draft began in 1965.

See also
 List of NCAA Division I baseball programs

References

External links